Nephele maculosa is a moth of the family Sphingidae. It is only known from the Congo-Cameroon equatorial forest belt.

References

Nephele (moth)
Moths described in 1903
Insects of Cameroon
Insects of West Africa
Insects of Uganda
Fauna of the Central African Republic
Fauna of the Republic of the Congo
Fauna of Gabon
Moths of Africa